The 12-pounder Whitworth rifle was a medium caliber field gun deployed during the mid-19th century. Designed by Joseph Whitworth, the gun was most notably used during the American Civil War. The gun was also used by the Imperial Brazilian Army in the War of the Triple Alliance.

Description 
The 12-pdr rifle was designed  in the early 1850s by British manufacturer Joseph Whitworth, who had recently been contracted to improve the Pattern 1853 Enfield. During his experiments with the Enfield, Whitworth was inspired to begin experimenting with a hexagonally-rifled barrel; Whitworth would later apply these principles to his field guns.

Along with Whitworth's smaller 3-pdr gun, the artillery piece was considered for adoption by the British government's Board of Ordnance. However, Whitworth's guns eventually lost out to the Armstrong gun. During the American Civil War the weapon was exported and saw service in the Union and Confederate armies, though it was considered a rarity.

From a design standpoint, the weapon was unique. Like all of Whitworth's designs, the weapon had a distinctive hexagon-ally rifled barrel and was a breechloader (though it could be loaded via the muzzle with modifications). The cannon was forged using a method in which iron plates would be overlapped and forced together using hydraulic presses. 

The 12-pounder Whitworth saw service with the Army of Northern Virginia. One Whitworth was used in the Confederate defense of Charleston. The weapon saw some service in the Union army (notably with the Army of the Potomac in the Peninsula campaign), and in one instance a group of Americans living in England gifted a battery of four Whitworths to the United States government. 

Despite being a rarity in the Civil War (one source states the weapon only saw Confederate service with the Army of Northern Virginia), a replica 12-pounder Whitworth was used on the set of The Good, the Bad and the Ugly.

References 

Artillery of the United Kingdom
American Civil War artillery